is a Finnish-born Japanese politician. He is the first foreign-born Japanese of European origin to serve as a member of the Diet of Japan. He is a member of the Democratic Party of Japan, where he served as Director General of the International Department.  He served in the House of Councillors from 2001 to 2013.

Biography 
Tsurunen was born Martti Turunen in the village of Höntönvaara in Lieksa, Finland, and grew up in nearby Jaakonvaara. Near the end of Continuation War, Tsurunen (then four years old) and his family were among the few survivors of a Soviet partisan attack on the village.

In 1967, at the age of 27, Tsurunen traveled to Japan as a lay missionary of the Lutheran Church, accompanied by his first wife, who was also a Finn; they later divorced. Having decided to become Japanese, he gained his Japanese citizenship in 1979. He moved to Yugawaramachi in Kanagawa Prefecture in 1981.

Political career 
He first ran for city council in 1992 in Yugawaramachi and won a seat, coming in fourth place with 1,051 votes.

He ran for a seat in the Upper House for Kanagawa without party backing in 1995. He received 339,484 votes, coming in fourth (the top three candidates were elected), losing a seat to the Socialist candidate who won 371,889 votes. He ran again in 1998 and took 502,712, just 8,000 short of winning a seat, telling voters "Please vote for me and send the first Japanese citizen with blue eyes to the upper house" and "Let's change Japan from an economic power into a citizen-friendly nation, where you don't need to worry about old age and pollution". He also proposed "sexual quotas for legislative bodies, so that from 40% to 60% of parliament and local assemblies would be female". In 2000, he ran as a candidate of the Democratic Party of Japan for a seat in the Lower House, and again in 2001 for a seat in the Upper House, both unsuccessfully. In 2001, he garnered 159,920 votes, 14,036 short of what he needed to win a seat. However, in 2002, an incumbent, Kyosen Ohashi, resigned from the house and he won a seat by "kuriage" replacement, by which he took the seat because he had the largest number of votes after the winner.

He was directly reelected in 2007 with 242,742 votes, the 6th-highest in his party, but lost his seat in the 2013 election after garnering only 82,858 votes (finishing in 12th place).

Family 

Tsurunen is married to Sachiko Tanaka, and they have two children. He also had three children with his Finnish wife.

In the media 

Finnish media personality Markus Kajo interviewed Tsurunen in Finnish for the third episode of the documentary series  in 2006.

Tsurunen published his autobiography Sinisilmäinen samurai ("The blue-eyed samurai") in 2015 via Gummerus.

See also

References

External links 
  Tsurunen.net
 Tsurunen.net
 Tsurunen's web site
  Tsurunen's web site

1940 births
Living people
People from Lieksa
Finnish Lutheran missionaries
Lutheran missionaries in Japan
Japanese Lutherans
Japanese people of Finnish descent
Naturalized citizens of Japan
Members of the House of Councillors (Japan)
Democratic Party of Japan politicians
Finnish emigrants to Japan
Japanese municipal councilors
Politicians from Kanagawa Prefecture
Yugawara, Kanagawa